Jules Cazaban (1903-1963) was a Romanian playwright and director.

Born in Fălticeni, Romania, he studied law at the University of Iaşi, and then at the Conservatory of Dramatic Art in the same city. At the beginning of his activity, he was a theater actor in Iaşi (between 1927 and 1929), then moved to Bucharest, where he  played an important role in theater and in the movie industry until his death.

His films include Thirst (1961), The Storm (1960) and Telegrame (1959).

Romanian theatre directors
People from Fălticeni
1903 births
1963 deaths
20th-century Romanian dramatists and playwrights